The Grand Canyon Antelopes (more commonly referred to as the Lopes) are the 21 athletic teams representing Grand Canyon University, located in Phoenix, Arizona.  Most of the university's athletic teams compete at the NCAA Division I level in the Western Athletic Conference. Men's volleyball competes in the Mountain Pacific Sports Federation (MPSF) effective beginning in the 2017–18 academic year. The beach volleyball program competes as an independent.

Athletic expansion
GCU was a member of the NAIA until the early 1990s when it transferred to NCAA Division II, in which it competed until 2013.

The university has undergone a transition from a small struggling non-profit liberal arts college to a large modern for-profit private university. Along with the general campus upgrades has come an increase in athletics and athletic facilities.

On November 27, 2012, Grand Canyon University announced that it had accepted an invitation to join Division I's Western Athletic Conference, effective July 1, 2013. This move made Grand Canyon the only for-profit institution with a Division I athletic program.

GCU's business model was at the center of an emerging controversy in college sports. In July 2013, the chief executives of all 12 members of the Pac-12 Conference sent a joint letter to the NCAA asking that the organization review whether for-profit institutions have a place in Division I sports. Later that year, Arizona State University issued a separate statement questioning the school's allegiance to the NCAA's business model. GCU CEO Brian Mueller accused ASU president Michael Crow of being behind the Pac-12 letter. Crow would later double down on his accusations, falsely claiming in 2017 that 11 of the 12 Pac-12 schools would not play GCU because of its for-profit business model, and also asserting that GCU sought to play Pac-12 schools solely for exposure on the Pac-12 Network. As of February 2018, ASU continues to refuse to schedule GCU in any sport; however, counter to Crow's 2017 assertion, 10 Pac-12 members have scheduled GCU in at least one sport since the Antelopes' move to Division I, although only Arizona and Utah had faced GCU in men's basketball.

The university announced a five-year sponsorship deal with Nike on May 27, 2015, as a part of Grand Canyon's athletic expansion.

On August 23, 2017, the NCAA officially approved Grand Canyon's move to Division I, elevating the university to active membership status. GCU immediately became eligible for postseason competition.

Sports 
Grand Canyon University sponsors teams in 10 men's and 11 women's NCAA sanctioned sports:

Baseball

GCU Baseball has won four NAIA Baseball World Series in 1980, 1981, 1982, and 1986. A number of Alumni have gone on to Major League Baseball careers. The program advanced to its first NCAA Tournament in 2021 after winning the WAC baseball tournament and followed it up in 2022 with its first at-large bid.

Men's basketball

Men's basketball is coached by Bryce Drew of NCAA Tournament lore.
GCU won three NAIA Men's Basketball Championships at the NAIA Division I level in 1975, 1978, and 1988, the 2007 PacWest Conference Championship and a berth in the 2007 NCAA Division II men's basketball tournament.
GCU has seen two Lopes basketball alumni go on to careers in the NBA, including: Horacio Llamas, the first Mexican-born player to play in an NBA game.; and Bayard Forrest, former basketball player with the Seattle SuperSonics and Phoenix Suns.
Croatian national team player Emilio Kovačić played his first university basketball seasons in Grand Canyon, before leaving to Arizona State. In 2021, the Antelopes won their first WAC championship and made their first NCAA appearance.

Women's basketball

Women's basketball won the 2007 PacWest Conference Championship and a berth in the 2007 NCAA Women's Division II Basketball Tournament.

Men's golf
Men's golf is coached by Mark Mueller whose father is GCU president Brian Mueller.

Men's soccer

Men's soccer won the 1996 NCAA Men's Division II Soccer Championship with a 3–1 win over Oakland University. The program qualified for its first NCAA Division I Tournament in 2018 after winning the WAC tournament as the No. 4 seed. The program also qualified in 2020 and 2021 with at-large berths.

Softball

Softball was added in 2004 and in 2010 the team made its first NCAA Tournament appearance in 2010. 2010 also saw the Lopes set a new program record for most wins in a season going 42–11. Under first-year head coach Shanon Hays, the program qualified for its first NCAA Division I Tournament in 2022 after winning the WAC Tournament.

Women's tennis
Women's tennis won the 1981 NAIA national women's tennis championship.

Men's track and field
Men's track team won the 2012 NCAA Division II men's Indoor Track and Field Championship scoring 54 points.

Wrestling
In March 2016, the school announced that it would discontinue the wrestling program.

Club sports

Lacrosse 
NCAA men's lacrosse made a brief appearance as an official school sport at GCU from 2008 to 2011. The team began in 2008 and played the first lacrosse game in school history on February 10, 2008, an 8–18 loss to the University of Arizona (MCLA DI). In 2010 GCU and the few other NCAA DII lacrosse programs in the Southwest formed the Western Intercollegiate Lacrosse Association In the Lopes' only season as a member of the WILA, the team recorded a 3–5 conference record. After a number of below .500 seasons combined with increasing travel costs due to lack of NCAA Division II competition in the university announced in March 2011 it would end Division II lacrosse competition.
Shortly after the university announced the program will compete at the varsity-club level in the Men's Collegiate Lacrosse Association. The program joined the Southwestern Lacrosse Conference (SLC) and plays in the MCLA Division I level in the SLC's Pacific Division. In 2015 and 2017, GCU won the MCLA Division 1 National Championship.

Rugby 
Men's rugby was approved for addition to the GCU club sports lineup in 2013. Although it is officially a club sport, the team is under the auspices of the Athletic Department, and has access to Athletic Department facilities and support personnel. The team began competing in the 2014–2015 academic year. Former University of Arizona collegiate All-American Ryan Kelly is the head coach, and rugby sevens specialist Merrick Firestone is the associate head coach.

GCU Rugby has undertaken a significant recruiting effort, bringing in a large initial recruiting class for the Fall 2014 semester that includes many experienced high school rugby players from across the country, including several High School Rugby All-American invitees. GCU Rugby anticipates hosting a Fall 7s tournament on the GCU campus in September 2014.

Ice Hockey 
Men's ice hockey began in 2016 at the ACHA DII and DIII levels until 2019 when they got accepted for the DI level. Women's ice hockey began in 2017 and is currently a member of the WWCHL and competes in DI of the ACHA.

Athletic facilities
Grand Canyon University has several athletic facilities where its 21 NCAA athletic programs host home games.

GCU Arena is host to the school's men's and women's basketball teams in addition to women's volleyball. The venue opened in 2011 as a 5,000-seat venue before being expanded to increase capacity to 7,000 seats in 2014.

The baseball team plays home games at Brazell Field at GCU Ballpark, where a brand new stadium was built to surround the existing field in 2018. The stadium is named after Grand Canyon's longtime baseball coach Dr. Dave Brazell. The softball team hosts its home games at GCU Softball Stadium which also opened in 2018.

GCU Stadium is home to the men's and women's soccer programs. The facility opened in 2016 and can hold in excess of 6,000 fans. GCU ranked in the top 10 in both 2016 and 2018 in average attendance for its men's soccer games.

Antelope Gymnasium, which used to house GCU's indoor sports, has served as a secondary indoor facility since 2011 after the opening of GCU Arena. Antelope Gymnasium is the full time venue for the men's volleyball team.

References

External links